Daniel Mateo Angulo (born 31 August 1989) is a Spanish long-distance runner. He has competed in several international competitions representing Spain in both track and field and cross country.

In 2019, he competed in the men's marathon at the 2019 World Athletics Championships held in Doha, Qatar. He finished in 10th place. He has qualified to represent Spain at the 2020 Summer Olympics in the men's marathon event.

Competition record

References

External links
 
 
 
 

1989 births
Living people
People from Soria
Sportspeople from the Province of Soria
Spanish male long-distance runners
Spanish male marathon runners
World Athletics Championships athletes for Spain
Athletes (track and field) at the 2020 Summer Olympics
Olympic athletes of Spain
Olympic male marathon runners
21st-century Spanish people